The 2009 NORCECA Beach Volleyball Circuit at Cayman Islands was held March 27–29, 2009 in Grand Cayman, Cayman Islands. It was the first leg of the NORCECA Beach Volleyball Circuit 2009.

Women's competition

Men's competition

References
 Norceca Tournament Results
 BV Database (Archived 2009-08-01)
 CaymanActive (Archived 2009-08-01)

Cayman Islands
Beach Volleyball Circuit